Juan Martín del Potro was the defending champion, but didn't participate due to a wrist injury.
David Nalbandian, ranked 117th, defeated Marcos Baghdatis 6–2, 7–6(7–4) in the final.

Seeds
All seeds received a bye into the second round.

Draw

Finals

Top half

Section 1

Section 2

Bottom half

Section 3

Section 4

Qualifying

Seeds

Qualifiers

Draw

First qualifier

Second qualifier

Third qualifier

Fourth qualifier

Fifth qualifier

Sixth qualifier

References
Main Draw
Qualifying Singles

Singles